Nina Ognianova is a Bulgarian journalist and rights activist, coordinator of the Europe and Central Asia Program of the Committee to Protect Journalists since 2006. Formerly a staff writer for the International Journalists' Network, since 2007 she has been a prominent figure in the investigations of the murders of Russian, Central Asian and Turkish journalists. In September 2009 she published a report Anatomy of Injustice on unsolved journalist murders in Russia, and in October 2012 published Turkey's Press Freedom Crisis, which investigates the anti-press campaign under Prime Minister Recep Tayyip Erdoğan. She has written numerous articles for major world newspapers; in September 2009 she authored an article "Getting away with murder in Russia:The unsolved killings of 17 journalists has had a chilling effect on the work of Russia's press" for The Guardian.

References

External links
Blog of Nina Ognianova

Bulgarian journalists
Bulgarian women journalists
Bulgarian activists
Living people
21st-century Bulgarian women writers
21st-century Bulgarian writers
Year of birth missing (living people)
Bulgarian women activists